The name Calès may refer to:

Places 
Calès is the name of two communes in France:
 Calès, Dordogne
 Calès, Lot

People 
 Jean-Marie Calès (1757–1834), French politician (republican deputy under the Ist Republic)
 Jean-Chrysostôme Calès (1769–1853), French Colonel and Baron (deputy under the Ist Empire)
 Godefroy Calès (1799–1868), French politician (republican deputy under the IInd Republic)
 Jean Jules Godefroy Calès (1828–1899), French politician (republican deputy under the IIIrd Republic)